This is a list of flags used in Zimbabwe (Africa) from 1980 to the present date. For flags before April 1980 see List of Rhodesian flags.

National Flag

Presidential Flag

Military Flags

Political Party Flags

Town Flags

Historical flags

Ethnic groups

See also
 Coat of arms of Zimbabwe
 Flag of Zimbabwe
 Simudzai Mureza wedu WeZimbabwe

List
Zimbabwe
Flags